WWRS-TV (channel 52) is a religious television station licensed to Mayville, Wisconsin, United States, serving the Milwaukee and Madison areas as an owned-and-operated station of the Trinity Broadcasting Network (TBN). The station's studios are located on North Barker Road in Brookfield, and its transmitter is located in Hubbard. WWRS-TV's signal covers much of southeastern and south-central Wisconsin, along with extended cable coverage throughout the area.

History
The station was formerly owned by National Minority Television, a de facto subsidiary of TBN that was used by the network to circumvent the Federal Communications Commission (FCC)'s television station ownership restrictions. While TBN founder Paul Crouch was NMTV's president, one of its directors was African American and the other was Latino, which met the FCC's definition of a "minority-controlled" firm. In mid-2008, the station and its NMTV sisters came directly under TBN ownership.

Like most TBN stations, WWRS simulcasts the TBN national feed for most of the day. TBN typically buys full-power stations mainly to get must-carry status on area cable systems, even though it offers almost no locally produced programming. However, WWRS airs FCC-required public affairs programming (Public Report) from its Brookfield studios, with a nominal presence retained in at the station's transmitting facility and former main studio in Iron Ridge. The station also airs church services from throughout the area, usually on Friday morning.

Charter Communications, the dominant cable provider in the Madison area, and several communities in the Milwaukee area before the 2017 purchase of Time Warner Cable and merge into Spectrum, added TBN and all of its digital subchannels to its systems in the area beginning late August 2007, within the provider's digital family tier of channels. However, beyond must-carry situations where WWRS-DT1 must be carried on analog cable in appropriate markets, the signal comes direct from TBN to the Spectrum headend, not through WWRS.

Subchannels

 The station's digital signal continued to broadcasts on its pre-transition UHF channel 43. Through the use of PSIP, digital television receivers display the station's virtual channel as its former UHF analog channel 52, which was among the high band UHF channels (52-69) that were removed from broadcasting use as a result of the transition.

Must-carry
On April 1, 2002, a dispute arose between Time Warner Cable's Milwaukee-area system and WWRS regarding must-carry regulations. Must-carry regulations require cable television providers within the Grade B contour of a full-power, full service television station to carry that station on their basic tier. When the dispute was settled, the FCC judged that the station was not required to be carried on the cable systems in the more distant counties of Kenosha, Racine and Walworth. However, WWRS was able to exercise must-carry to the Time Warner Cable lineup in southeastern Wisconsin. This, combined with the lack of available channel space, caused the forced move of Madison's PBS member and PBS Wisconsin flagship station WHA-TV (channel 21) to the digital cable tier in order to air WWRS on the basic cable tier.

References

External links

TBN.org/publicfile/WWRS/ (WWRS's public file)
History of Milwaukee television

Television channels and stations established in 1997
WRS-TV
1997 establishments in Wisconsin
Trinity Broadcasting Network affiliates
Dodge County, Wisconsin